Radič is a Serbian masculine given name, popular in the Middle Ages. It is derived from the Slavic word root rad- ("happy, eager, to care"), with the Slavic suffix -ič, a diminutive of Radoslav, Radomir, etc. Notable people with the name include:

Radič Branković ( 1352–79), Serbian Imperial lord of Braničevo
Radič Crnojević (fl. 1392–96), Serbian lord of Upper Zeta
Radič Sanković (fl. 1391–1404), Bosnian lord of Nevesinje
Radič, Grand Čelnik (fl. 1413–41), magnate of the Serbian Despotate
Radič Božić (fl. 1502–28), last Serbian Despot
Radič Petrović (1738–1816), Serbian Revolutionary

See also
Radić, Serbo-Croatian surname
Radičević
Radičevac
Radičevci

Serbian masculine given names